Currents is the fourth full-length album by the band Eisley. It was released on May 28, 2013, on Equal Vision Records. The title-track song "Currents," is the first official single from the album, and was publicly released on April 23, 2013. On April 16, 2013, Eisley released an online stream of the song "Drink The Water," hosted by Nylon Magazine. The streaming of this song marked the first full-length song to be heard from Currents.

The album charted at number 66 on the Billboard 200, making it the group's highest-charting album to date.

Production (May–October, 2012)
The group began production of their fourth studio album on May 5, 2012, in their studio constructed in their hometown of Tyler, TX. The studio was built by members Weston Dupree and Garron DuPree, alongside their audio engineer Mark Schwartzkopf. The studio itself was built to be attached to the house of singer Sherri DuPree-Bemis, and Say Anything frontman Max Bemis. Upon completion of the studio in late April 2012, the group began the pre-production and tracking of the album in early May, 2012.

This album was the first of the group's albums to be entirely self-produced, recorded with virtually no outside influences. The album, though unnamed until after the recording process was completed, features a lush oceanic theme, complemented by a more layered atmospheric production.

Track listing
All songs recorded by Eisley.

Credits

Songwriting
Sherri DuPree-Bemis
Stacy DuPree-King
 Chauntelle DuPree-D'Agostino (Millstone)

Instrumentation
Sherri DuPree-Bemis - guitar, vocals
Stacy DuPree-King - Piano/Keyboards, guitar, vocals
Chauntelle DuPree-D'Agostino - guitar, vocals
Garron DuPree - bass, guitar
Weston DuPree - drums, misc instrumentation
Jeremy Larson - strings
Christie DuPree - guest vocals (Wicked Child)
Collin DuPree - acoustic guitar (Currents)
Max Bemis - bridge (Save My Soul)

Production
Jeremy Larson - mixing
Garron DuPree - recording engineer, audio engineer
Mark Schwartzkopf - additional engineering

References

Eisley albums
2013 albums